Tod Carter (born November 18 in Chicago, Illinois) is an American animation director, writer and storyboard artist who has contributed to feature films and many direct to video productions.
His contributions can be seen in Space Jam and Disney sequels for Hunchback of Notre Dame, Little Mermaid, Tarzan, and The Fox and the Hound. He has also contributed as the head of writing and story development for many films and projects for Big Idea Productions, producers of the highly successful VeggieTales, 3-2-1 Penguins and Larryboy series.
He currently directs animated projects for Brain Freeze Entertainment, a company which he founded in 2008.

Carter's animation work also includes Quest for Camelot, which was nominated for an Annie Award for "Outstanding Achievement in an Animated Theatrical Feature."

References

External links
 Tod Carter's Official Site
 

Year of birth missing (living people)
Living people
Animators from Illinois
American film producers
American animated film directors
Artists from Chicago
University of Illinois Chicago alumni
American film directors
Walt Disney Animation Studios people
American storyboard artists